Buster Poindexter is an eponymous album released by RCA Records in 1987 by Buster Poindexter, the alter ego of New York Dolls frontman David Johansen. Johansen re-recorded the track "Heart of Gold" as Buster Poindexter, which originally appeared on Johansen's 1981 solo album Here Comes the Night.  The song "Hot Hot Hot" was a Billboard single and received heavy play on MTV.

Track listing
 "Smack Dab in the Middle" - 3:52 (Chuck Calhoun, Michael Mains)
 "Bad Boy" - 3:07 (Avon Long, Lil Hardin Armstrong)
 "Hot Hot Hot" - 4:07 (Alphonsus "Arrow" Cassell)
 "Are You Lonely for Me, Baby?" - 3:38 (Bert Berns)
 "Screwy Music" - 3:17 (Jimmie Lunceford)
 "Good Morning Judge" - 3:37 (Louis Innis, Wynonie Harris)
 "Oh Me, Oh My (I'm a Fool for You Baby)" - 3:52 (Jim Doris)
 "Whadaya Want?" - 2:44 (Jerry Leiber, Mike Stoller)
 "House of the Rising Sun" - 3:40 (Traditional; credited to Josh White; Terry Holmes)
 "Cannibal" - 4:45 (David Johansen, Joe Delia)
 "Heart of Gold" - 4:40 (David Johansen)

Personnel
Buster Poindexter and His Banshees of Blue
Buster Poindexter - vocals
Patti Scialfa - backing vocals
Crispin Cioe - alto and baritone saxophone
Joe Delia - organ, piano, horn arrangements
Bob Funk - trombone
Tony "Antoine Fats" Garnier - bass
Carl Hall - backing vocals
Arno Hecht - tenor saxophone
"Hollywood" Paul Litteral - trumpet
Brian Koonin - guitar, banjo, mandolin
Lisa Lowell - backing vocals
Tony Machine - drums (3rd drummer New York Dolls: 1976-77)
Soozie Tyrell - violin, backing vocals
Louise Bethune - backing vocals
Fred Wolcott - percussion
Larry Poindexter - accordion
Technical
John Sheard - associate producer, Synclavier and string arrangements
Bill Scheniman - engineer, mixing
Ria Lewerke - art direction
Ken Nahoum - photography

External links
https://www.facebook.com/officialBusterPoindexter?ref=ts&fref=ts
https://web.archive.org/web/20160303225425/http://goto.glocalnet.net/newyorkdolls/
David Johansen Resource

[ David Johansen] at Allmusic
[ Buster Poindexter] at Allmusic

1987 albums
Buster Poindexter albums
RCA Records albums